Karen is a suburb of Nairobi in Kenya, lying south-west of Nairobi's central business district.
The suburb of Karen borders the Ngong Forest and is home to the Ngong Racecourse. Karen and Langata jointly form a somewhat isolated area of mid to high-income residents.

History
Karen was previously in Ngong County. After Nairobi received city status in 1950 the counties were redefined. In 1963 Karen was placed under the Nairobi City Council's administration.

It is generally considered that the suburb is named after Karen Blixen, the Danish author of the colonial memoir Out of Africa; her farm occupied the land where the suburb now stands.  Blixen declared in her later writings that "the residential district of Karen" was "named after me," although it has never been formally recognised.

Blixen's home has since become a museum and is still standing and is a local tourist attraction, other tourist attractions are the giraffe center, the exclusive giraffe manor and the ololua nature trails.

Cityscape

Karen is a vibrant residential suburb characterized by big mansions, many trees, a tranquil atmosphere, and plush gardens this is due to the areas minimum acreage requirement for all homeowners. Karen is also a center for many upscale restaurants and hotels in the city, offering cuisines from around the country and the world. There is a branch of the Red Cross in Karen.

Government
The Karengata Association manages Karen and Langata. It was organized in 1940 and by 2010 it had begun to manage the area's infrastructure.

Demographics
Karen is mainly populated by the wealthier demographic of Kenyans, as well as the political class.

Education

The West Nairobi School is located in Karen. The current campus opened in 2000.

The Nairobi Japanese School is located in the Lang'ata area, in proximity to Karen.

Notable residents
Ellinor Catherine Cunningham van Someren (1915–1988), entomologist
Gurner Robert Cunningham van Someren, ornithologist

General references
 De Lame, Danielle. "Grey Nairobi: Sketches of Urban Socialities." In: Charton-Bigot, Hélène and Deyssi Rodriguez-Torres (editors). Nairobi Today: The Paradox of a Fragmented City. African Books Collective, 2010. p. 167-214. , 9789987080939. The source edition is an English translation, published by Mkuki na Nyota Publishers Ltd.  of Dar es Salaam, Tanzania in association with the French Institute for Research in Africa (IFRA)  of Nairobi. The book was originally published in French as Nairobi contemporain: Les paradoxes d'une ville fragmentée, Karthala Editions (Hommes et sociétés, ISSN 0993-4294). French version article: "Gris Nairobi: Esquisses de sociabilités urbaines." p. 221-284. , 9782845867871.
 Includes a section on Karen and Langata, titled "Karen and Langata: Gardens and Suburbs", p. 174-179 (In French: "Karen et Langata, jardins et faubourgs", p. 231-237).

References

Further reading
 Muhumuza, Ahumuza. "In the footsteps of Karen Blixen." The East African. Monday, March 14, 2011. - Available at AllAfrica.com

British diaspora in Africa
European Kenyan
Populated places in Kenya
Suburbs of Nairobi